Butyriboletus subappendiculatus is a pored mushroom in the family Boletaceae. This European species was originally described as a species of Boletus in 1979, but later transferred to Butyriboletus in 2014. It is considered endangered in the Czech Republic.

References

External links

subappendiculatus
Fungi described in 1979
Fungi of Europe